Barkai is a surname. Notable people with the surname include:

Amiram Barkai (1936–2014), Israeli biochemist
Avraham Barkai (born 1921), German-born Israeli historian
Eli Barkai (born 1964), Israeli physicist
Gabriel Barkai (born 1944), Hungarian-born Israeli archeologist
Michael Barkai (1935–1999), Romanian-born Israeli Navy commander
Razi Barkai (born 1949), Israeli media personality
Ram Barkai (born 1957), Israeli-South African businessman and swimmer